Ipochus is a genus of longhorn beetles of the subfamily Lamiinae, containing the following species:

 Ipochus fasciatus LeConte, 1852
 Ipochus insularis Blaisdell, 1925

References

Parmenini